The following lists events that happened during 1946 in Jordan.

Incumbents
Monarch: Abdullah I 
Prime Minister: Ibrahim Hashem

Events

March
 March 22 - The United Kingdom grants Transjordan, as it is then known, its independence; 3 years later the country changes its name to Jordan.

See also

 Years in Iraq
 Years in Syria
 Years in Saudi Arabia

References

 
1940s in Jordan
Jordan
Jordan
Years of the 20th century in Jordan